Benjamin Williamson Taylor (16 June 1873 – 24 August 1938) was an English first-class cricketer active 1902–09 who played for Nottinghamshire. He was born in Kimberley, Nottinghamshire; died in Eastwood, Nottinghamshire.

References

1873 births
1938 deaths
English cricketers
Nottinghamshire cricketers
People from Kimberley, Nottinghamshire
Cricketers from Nottinghamshire